Tampramine (AHR-9,377) is a tricyclic antidepressant (TCA) which was developed in the 1980s but was never marketed. Despite being a TCA, it acts as a selective norepinephrine reuptake inhibitor and has negligible affinity for adrenergic, histaminergic, and muscarinic receptors. It was found to be effective in the forced swim test (FST) model of depression in animal studies but is not known to have ever been trialed in humans.

See also 
 Tricyclic antidepressant

References 

Abandoned drugs
Dimethylamino compounds
Pyridobenzodiazepines
Tricyclic antidepressants